The Winning Colors Stakes is a Grade III American Thoroughbred horse race for fillies and mares, four years old and older over a distance six furlongs on the dirt scheduled annually in late May at Churchill Downs in Louisville, Kentucky.

History 

The event was inaugurated in 2004 as the Winning Colors Handicap in honor of the Kentucky Derby winning filly Winning Colors. 

In 2007 the event was upgraded to a Grade III.

The event has been usually held on the Memorial Day weekend.

Records
Speed record
 1:08:07 - Dubai Majesty (2010)
Most wins
 2 – Dubai Majesty (2009, 2010)
 2 – Sconsin (2021, 2022)
Most wins by a jockey
 3 – Julien R. Leparoux (2008, 2014, 2016)
Most wins by a trainer
 4 – W. Bret Calhoun (2009, 2010, 2012, 2017)
Most wins by an owner
 3 – Martin Racing Stable (2009, 2010, 2013)

Winners

Notes:

† Dead heat

See also
List of American and Canadian Graded races

References

Graded stakes races in the United States
Sprint category horse races for fillies and mares
Recurring sporting events established in 2004
Churchill Downs horse races
2004 establishments in Kentucky
Grade 3 stakes races in the United States